Skurholmen is a residential area in Luleå, Sweden. It had 4,492 inhabitants in 2010.

References

External links
Skurholmen at Luleå Municipality

Luleå
Municipalities of Norrbotten County